City Records (full legal name in Serbian: Предузеће за издавачко-пропагандну делатност City Records д.о.о. Београд/Preduzeće za izdavačko-propagandnu delatnost City Records d.o.o. Beograd) is a Serbian record label. Founded in 1997, the record label is part of the Pink Media Group. It is the home of some of the best selling Balkans pop artists.

City Records has signed licensing agreements with many European artists, increasing the exposure of these artists and the distribution of their musical work in the market.

Artists
Artists signed to City Records, or who had been in the past, include:

Alen Islamović (1999, 2013–present)
Aca Lukas (2010-2013)
Alka Vuica (2001-2013)
Adil (2010–present)
Acapulco Band (2007–present)
Jurica Pađen (2013)
Akustična soba (2007)
Adnan Babajić (2011)
Aleksandar Živanović (2015-prensent)
Aleksandra Perović (2007–present)
Aleksandra Radović (2003–present)
Amadeus Band (2003-2015)
Ana Nikolić (2003–present)
Ana Milenković (2010–present)
Ana Stanić (2003)
Anabela Atijas (2009-2015)
Andrej Ilić (2011)
Baki B3 (2000-2007, 2010–present)
Beat Street (1997-2000, 2014–present)
Beso De Loco Band (2014–present)
Biber (2004, 2016–present)
Boris Novković (2003–present)
Boban Rajović (2000, 2010-2013)
Bojan Bjelić (2003, 2013)
Bojan Marović (2011–present)
Boki 13 (2012)
Boris Režak (2003–present)
Ceca Ražnatović (2001, 2013–present)
Ceca Slavković (1999-2003)
Ćemo (2013–present)
Charter (2013–present)
Colonia (2003-2010, 2013–present)
Crvena jabuka (2002-2011)
Cvija (2011-2015)
Dado Glišić (2005–present)
Dado Polumenta (2013–present)
Dado Topić (2005)
Dana Karić (2010–present)
Danijel Đokić (2001-2005, 2012–present)
Danijel Đurić (1999-2003, 2012-2014)
Danijel Pavlović (2011-2016)
Danijela Karić (2014–present)
Danijela Martinović (2003–present)
Danijela Vranić (2011–present)
Danilo Živković (2015–present)
Dara Bubamara (2013-2014, 2016–present)
Darija Stanojević (2011–present)
Darko Radovanović (2005-2011)
Davor Jovanović (2013-2014)
Dino Merlin (2004-2009)
Dragana Mirković (2016–present)
Duck (1998-2003)
Dunja Ilić (2011-2013)
Dženan Lončarević (2007–present)
Đogani (2001-2013)
Elena Risteska (2007)
Elena Todorović (2007-2015)
Ella (2012–present)
Ella B (1998-2004)
Električni Orgazam (1999)
Emina Jahović (2002-2005, 2012–present)
Energija (1999–present)
Fantastic Band (2013–present)
Feeling (2014–present)
Flamingosi (2005-2016)
Funky G (1999-2001, 2002–present)
Gabrijela Pejčev (2015–present)
Gala (1999-2006)
Goca Tržan (2001, 2008–present)
Goga Sekulić (2000, 2004, 2013–present)
Goran Bregović (2012)
Goran Karan (2008–present)
Gru (2002-2009)
Halid Beslic (2010–present)
Hari Mata Hari (2009–present)
Haris Džinović (2010–present)
Igor Starović (2008–present)
Igor Vukojević (2001, 2014–present)
In vivo (2011–present)
Indira Radić (2015–present)
Ivana Gavrilović (2001–present)
Ivan Kurtić (2015–present)
Ivan Plavšić (2009, 2014–present)
Ivana Banfić (2003)
Ivan Ćosić (2002, 2013–present)
Ivana Jordan (2000)
Jadranka Barjaktarović (2015–present)
Jasna Gospić (2004–present)
Ivana Brkić (2003)
Jadranka Barjaktarovic (2016–present)
Jami (2006)
Jellena (2001–present)
Jelena Karleuša (2005-2013)
Jelena Rozga (2006–present)
Jelena Tomašević (2008–present)
Kaliopi (2008–present)
Kao Kao Band (2013-2016)
Karma (2001–present)
Karolina Gočeva (2003–present)
Katarina Sotirović (2007–present)
Katarina Ostojić Kaya (2006)
Kemal Monteno (2003)
Koktel Band (2002-2004, 2010)
Ksenija Mijatović (1998–present)
Ksenija Pajčin (2001-2010)
Knez (1998–present)
Lana (2003, 2010, 2014–present)
Leo (2000–present)
Leontina (1998–present)
Lexington Band (2010–present)
Ljupka Stević (2012–present)
Love Hunters (2002)
Luna (2001-2006, 2009-2014, 2017-present)
Magazin (2002–present)
Maya Berović (2012–present)
Magnifico (2004-2008)
Maja Marković (2010–present)
Maja Milošević (2015–present)
Maja Nikolić (2008–present)
Mari Mari (2004–present)
Marija Šerifović (2003-2015)
Marijana Zlopaša (2010)
Marina Perazić (1998)
Marina Tadić (2008-2015)
Marina Visković (2012–present)
Marko Bulat (2013)
Marko Đuroviski (2006–present)
Marko Nikolić (2007)
Marko Žujović (2013)
Marko Šabanović (2016–present)
Martin Vučić (2005)
Massimo Savić (2006–present)
Maya Sar (2013–present)
Mega Bend (2011-2016)
Mia Borisavljević (2012-2014, 2016–present)
Miki Perić (2014–present)
Milan Stanković (2014–present)
Milena Vućić (2007-2014)
Miligram (2010, 2013–present)
Milioš Radovanović (2015–present)
Minea (2003)
Minja Samardžić (2015–present)
Mira Škorić (2000, 2015)
Mirko Gavrić (2012–present)
Mišo Kovač (2006)
Moby Dick (1998, 2003–present)
Models (band) (2001-2004, 2014–present)
Nataša Bekvalac (2001–present)
Neda Ukraden (2009-2014)
Nedeljko Bajić Baja (2014–present)
Negative (2004–present)
Nemanja Stevanović (2010-2012)
Nenad Cvijetić (2012–present)
Neverne Bebe (2012–present)
Nikolija (2013–2016)
Nina Badrić (2003-2006, 2011–present)
Nino Rešić (1998)
Ognjen Amidžić (2005–present)
Ognjen Radivojević (2010)
OK Band (1999-2017)
Oliver Dragojević (2002–present)
Oliver Mandić (2001, 2006)
Osvajači (2002, 2011)
Pavle Dejanić (2015–present)
Petar Grašo (2003–present)
Piloti (2012–present)
Plavi orkestar (1998)
Projekat Band (2012–present)
Regina (2000, 2012–present)
Renato Henc (2013-2016)
Riblja Čorba (2007–present)
Romana (1999-2015)
Sandra Afrika (2016–present)
Šaban Šaulić (2016–present)
Šako Polumenta (2013-2015)
Saša Kovačević (2006–present)
Saša Vasić (2002, 2009)
Seka Aleksić (2015–present)
Selma Bajrami (2014)
Sergej Ćetković (2005–present)
Severina (2002-2008, 2011–present)
Sha-ila (2000-2004)
Slađa Delibašić (2001–present)
Slavica Ćukteraš (2015–present)
Slobodan Radanović (2015–present)
Snežana Nena Nešić (2013–present)
Tamara Filipović (2012)
Tanja Banjanin (2010)
Tanja Savić (2014)
Tap 011 (2001-2003)
Teodora Baković (2012–present)
Teška Industrija (2011–present)
Tijana Dapčević (2002–present)
Tonči Huljić (2008–present)
Tony Cetinski (2003-2007, 2012–present)
Toše Proeski (2006-2007)
Tribal band (2009–present)
Trik Fx (1999-2006, 2009-2014, 2016-present)
Tropico Band (2006–present)
Twins (1999-2005)
Valentino (2001–present)
Vesna Pisarović (2002-2006)
Viki Miljković (2012-2016)
Zana (2001–present)
Zdravko Čolić (2004–present)
Željko Bebek (2009–present)
Željko Joksimović (1999–present)
Željko Samardžić (2001–present)
Željko Šašić (1999, 2001, 2014–present)
Željko Vasić (2012-2016)
Zorana Pavić (1999–present)
Zorica Brunclik (2015–present)

See also
List of record labels

References

External links

 
D.o.o. companies in Serbia
List of City Records artists
List of City Records albums
Pop record labels
Record labels established in 1998
1997 establishments in Serbia
Companies based in Belgrade
Serbian record labels